Dennis Roman "Denny" Newinski (August 21, 1944 – February 10, 2009) was an American politician and machinist.

Newinski was born in Minneapolis, Minnesota. He graduated from DeSasalle High School, Minneapolis, in 1963. Newinski went to Dunwoody College of Technology. He lived in Maplewood, Minnesota with his wife and family and was a machinist working for Northern States Power Company until he retired in 2000.. Newinski was a Democrat. In 1988, he then joined the Republican Party. Newinski served in the Minnesota House of Representatives in 1991 and 1992. He also ran for the Republican nomination for the United States House of Representatives in 1994, in1996, and in 1998 and lost the election He died from cancer at his home, in Maplewood, Minnesota, after being exposed to asbestos.

References

1944 births 
2009 deaths
People from Maplewood, Minnesota
Politicians from Minneapolis
Machinists
Minnesota Democrats
Minnesota Republicans 
Members of the Minnesota House of Representatives
Deaths from cancer in Minnesota